St. Joseph's Preparatory School, known as "St. Joseph's Prep" or simply "The Prep", is an urban, private, Catholic, college preparatory school run by the Jesuits in Philadelphia, Pennsylvania, United States. It was founded in 1851.

Curriculum 
The credits must satisfy the minimums in religious studies (4), English (4), mathematics / computer science (4), history (3), science (3), classics & modern language (5), fine arts (1), electives (2). A minimum of two of the language credits must be in classics.

Extracurricular activities

Athletics 
St. Joseph's Prep's athletic teams compete as one of the 16 schools in the Philadelphia Catholic League. The Prep joined the Pennsylvania Interscholastic Athletic Association in the 2007–2008 school year. The Prep offers the following athletic programs:

Fall: cross country, football (varsity, junior varsity, and freshmen), crew (varsity and junior varsity), rugby, soccer (varsity, junior varsity, and freshmen), squash (varsity and junior varsity), Ultimate Frisbee (club), and golf.

Winter: basketball (varsity, junior varsity, and freshmen), bowling (varsity and junior varsity), indoor track and field, swimming, wrestling (varsity and junior varsity), and ice hockey (varsity, junior varsity, and freshmen).

Spring: baseball (varsity, junior varsity, and freshman), crew (varsity, junior varsity, and freshmen), volleyball, lacrosse, outdoor track and field, tennis, Ultimate Frisbee (club), and rugby (varsity, junior varsity, freshmen/sophomore). The boys senior eight crew team has won the Stotesbury Cup in national competition 13 times; in 1955, 1987, 1992, 1995, 1997, 1999–2001, 2005, 2008, 2010, 2019 and 2021.  In 2000, the Prep Varsity 8 won the Princess Elizabeth Challenge Cup at the Henley Royal Regatta.  In 2021, St. Joseph's Prep won the USRowing Youth National Championship in the Men's 8+ for the first time.  This was the first time a scholastic team won the national championship in over a decade.

The Prep football team won back-to-back state championships, winning the Class 4A state championship in 2014 with a 49–41 win against Pine-Richland High School in the finals. Despite losing to La Salle College High School early in the 2015 playoffs, the St. Joseph's Prep football team won the first ever Class 6A PIAA state championship, defeating Pittsburgh Central Catholic by a score of 42–7 at HersheyPark Stadium in Hershey, Pennsylvania. The team won the program's fourth state title in 2018 with a 40–20 win against Harrisburg High School in the Class 6A tournament final.

Notable alumni

Business
 W. Nicholas Howley (Class of 1970), founder/chairman of TransDigm Group
 John McShain (Class of 1914), building contractor; known as "The Man Who Built Washington"
 Frank Quattrone (Class of 1973), investment banker; founder/CEO of Qatalyst Group

Catholic Church
 William J. Byron (Class of 1945), former president of The Catholic University of America and the University of Scranton; president of the Prep, 2006–2008
 Cardinal John Foley (Class of 1953), former president of the Pontifical Council for Social Communications and former Grand Master of the Equestrian Order of the Holy Sepulchre of Jerusalem
 Joseph Anthony Galante (Class of 1956), former bishop of the Roman Catholic Diocese of Camden, New Jersey
 Joseph A. Sellinger (Class of 1938), former president Loyola College in Maryland
 Francis B. Schulte (Class of 1944), retired Archbishop of New Orleans
 Francis X. Talbot (Class of 1906), former president of Loyola College in Maryland

Entertainment
 Jimmy Bruno (Class of 1971), jazz guitarist
 Joe DeCamara (Class of 1996), Host of the WIP Morning Show
 Matt Duke (Class of 2003), singer-songwriter/musician signed to the label Rykodisc, released multiple albums
 Henry Gibson (Class of 1953), former star of Rowan & Martin's Laugh-In
 Henry Jones (Class of 1931), Tony Award-winning actor
 Rob McElhenney (Class of 1995), creator and co-star of the TV show, It's Always Sunny in Philadelphia. A fictional version of the school appears in the show. Co-owner of Welsh association football club Wrexham A.F.C.
 Michael Rady (Class of 1999), actor featured in The Sisterhood of the Traveling Pants and  star of TV drama Melrose Place
 Daniel Kamihira White (Class of 1999), magician, host of the Discovery Channel show The Supernaturalist

Education and Academia
 Robert L. Barchi (Class of 1964), president of Rutgers University; former president of Thomas Jefferson University
 Mark C. Reed (Class of 1992), president of Loyola University Chicago; former president of St. Joseph's University
 Joseph A. Sellinger (Class of 1939), former president of Loyola University Maryland
 Michael J. Wade (Class of 1967), evolutionary biologist.

Engineering
 John R. Casani (Class of 1950), engineer and project manager at NASA's Jet Propulsion Laboratory (JPL).

Military
 Navy Rear Admiral Joseph F. Kilkenny (Class of 1973), commander, U.S. Navy Carrier Strike Group 10 and Naval Recruiting Command
 Army Major Brian J. Reed (Class of 1985), operations officer, Fourth Infantry Division's First Brigade Combat Team; planner for Operation Red Dawn; member of the University of Maryland's Center for Research on Military Organization

Politics, Government, and Labor
 John F. Byrne Sr. (born 1911), former Philadelphia City Councilman (D); former Pennsylvania state senator
 Johnny Dougherty (Class of 1978), Business Manager of Local 98 of the International Brotherhood of Electrical Workers
 Andrew von Eschenbach (Class of 1959), former United States Commissioner of Food and Drugs, director at BioTime, a biotechnology company
 Vince Fumo (Class of 1960), former Pennsylvania state senator (D); former Ranking Democratic Member of the Pennsylvania Senate Appropriations Committee
 William J. Green, III (Class of 1956), former congressman; former mayor of Philadelphia
 William K. Greenlee (Class of 1971), Philadelphia City Councilman (D)
 Jim Kenney (Class of 1976), former Philadelphia City Councilman (D) (1992–2015); Mayor of Philadelphia
 Gerald Austin McHugh, Jr. (Class of 1972), judge, United States District Court for the Eastern District of Pennsylvania
 Michael A. Nutter (Class of 1975), former Philadelphia City Councilman (D); former mayor of Philadelphia
 Brian J. O'Neill (Class of 1978), Minority Leader of the Philadelphia City Council (R)
 Matthew J. Ryan (Class of 1950), former Speaker of the Pennsylvania House of Representatives (R)

Sports
 Tom Burgoyne (Class of 1983), mascot for the Philadelphia Phillies, the Phanatic
 Peter Cipollone (Class of 1989), 2004 Olympic gold-medalist and world record-holder in rowing
 Kyle Criscuolo (born 1992), ice hockey forward who has played in the NHL for the Buffalo Sabres.
 Frank Costa (Class of 1990), former Miami Hurricanes quarterback
 Colin Farrell (Class of 2001), World Champion rower and Head Coach for University of Pennsylvania Lightweight Men's Crew
 Rich Gannon (Class of 1983), former professional football player; won NFL Most Valuable Player Award in the 2002 season, helped the Oakland Raiders advance to Super Bowl XXXVII
 Matt Guokas (Class of 1962), former NBA player and head coach of the Philadelphia 76ers and Orlando Magic
 Marvin Harrison Jr. (Class of 2020), American football player for The Ohio State Buckeyes
 Victor Hobson (Class of 1998), former NFL player for the Arizona Cardinals
 Jim Knowles (Class of 1983), former head coach of Cornell University football team, defensive coordinator, Ohio State University football team
 Phil Martelli (Class of 1972), former head coach of Saint Joseph's University basketball team, current assistant coach of University of Michigan basketball team
 Jim McKay (Class of 1939), ABC Sports anchorman; contributor of services to 2006 FIFA World Cup
John Reid (Class of 2015), NFL cornerback for the Houston Texans
Jon Runyan Jr. (Class of 2015), NFL offensive lineman for the Green Bay Packers
 Kevin Stefanski (Class of 2000), NFL Head Coach for the Cleveland Browns
 D'Andre Swift (Class of 2017), NFL running back for the Detroit Lions
Olamide Zaccheaus (Class of 2015), NFL wide receiver for the Atlanta Falcons
Kyle McCord (Class of 2020), American football player for The Ohio State Buckeyes

Writers / Authors
 Richard Corliss (Class of 1961), film critic and editor for TIME magazine. 
 Chris McDougall (Class of 1980), author of Born to Run

See also
 List of Jesuit sites

References

 Twyman, Anthony S., "Prepped for Politics". Philadelphia Inquirer.  23 November 2005.

External links 

Boys' schools in the United States
Roman Catholic secondary schools in Philadelphia
Jesuit high schools in the United States
Educational institutions established in 1851
1851 establishments in Pennsylvania
Fairmount, Philadelphia